Balmuccia (Piedmontese: Balmucia) is a comune (municipality) in the Province of Vercelli in the Italian region Piedmont, located about  northeast of Turin and about  northwest of Vercelli. It lies at the confluence of the stream Sermenza with the Sesia river.

Balmuccia borders the following municipalities: Boccioleto, Cravagliana, Rossa, Scopa, and Vocca.

References

Cities and towns in Piedmont